Lebanon is a small country in the Middle East, located at approximately 34˚N, 35˚E. It stretches along the eastern shore of the Mediterranean Sea and its length is almost three times its width. From north to south, the width of its terrain becomes narrower. Lebanon's mountainous terrain, proximity to the sea, and strategic location at a crossroads of the world were decisive factors in shaping its history.

The country's role in the region, as indeed in the world at large, was shaped by trade. It serves as a link between the Mediterranean world and India and East Asia. The merchants of the region exported oil, grain, textiles, metal work, and pottery through the port cities to Western markets.

Physical geography and regions
The country is roughly rectangular in shape, becoming narrower toward the south and the farthest north. Because Lebanon straddles the northwest of the Arabian Plate, it is sometimes geopolitically grouped together with nations with adjacent tectonic proximations such as Syria, Yemen, Oman, Qatar, Bahrain, Kuwait, Iraq, Saudi Arabia, Jordan, the Egyptian Sinai, Israel and the UAE.

The physical geography of Lebanon is influenced by natural systems that extend outside the country. Thus, the Beqaa Valley is part of the Great Rift system, which stretches from southern Turkey to Mozambique in Africa. Like any mountainous country, Lebanon's physical geography is complex. Land forms, climate, soils, and vegetation differ markedly within short distances. There are also sharp changes in other elements of the environment, from good to poor soils, as one moves through the Lebanese mountains.

A major feature of Lebanese topography is the alternation of lowland and highland that runs generally parallel with a north-to-south orientation. There are four such longitudinal strips between the Mediterranean Sea and Syria: the coastal strip (or the maritime plain), western Lebanon, the central plateau, and eastern Lebanon.

The extremely narrow coastal strip stretches along the shore of the eastern Mediterranean. A few kilometers south at Juniyah the approximately 1.5-kilometer-wide plain is succeeded by foothills that rise steeply to  within  from the sea. For the most part, the coast is abrupt and rocky. The shoreline is regular with no deep estuary, gulf, or natural harbor. The maritime plain is especially productive of fruits and vegetables.

The western range, the second major region, is the Lebanon Mountains, sometimes called Mount Lebanon, or Lebanon proper before 1920. Since Roman days the term Mount Lebanon has encompassed this area. Antilibanos (Anti-Lebanon) was used to designate the eastern range. Geologists believe that the twin mountains once formed one range. The Lebanon Mountains are the highest, most rugged, and most imposing of the whole maritime range of mountains and plateaus that start with the Nur Mountains in northern Syria and end with the towering massif of Sinai. The mountain structure forms the first barrier to communication between the Mediterranean and Lebanon's eastern hinterland. The mountain range is a clearly defined unit having natural boundaries on all four sides. On the north it is separated from the Al-Ansariyah mountains of Syria by Nahr al-Kabir ("the great river"); on the south it is bounded by Al Qasimiyah River, giving it a length of 169 kilometers. It rises to alpine heights southeast of Tripoli. Qurnat as Sawda' ("the black nook") reaches  and is the highest mountain of Lebanon. Of the other peaks that rise east of Beirut, Mount Sannine is the highest. Ahl al Jabal ("people of the mountain"), or simply jabaliyyun, has referred traditionally to the inhabitants of western Lebanon. Near its southern end, the Lebanon Mountains branch off to the west to form the Shuf Mountains.

The third geographical region is the Beqaa Valley. Its middle section spreads out more than its two extremities. Geologically, the Beqaa is the medial part of a depression that extends north to the western bend of the Orontes River in Syria and south to Jordan through Arabah to Aqaba, the eastern arm of the Red Sea. The Beqaa is the country's chief agricultural area and served as a granary of Roman Syria. Beqaa is the Arabic plural of buqaah, meaning a place with stagnant water.

Emerging from a base south of Homs in Syria, the eastern mountain range, or Anti-Lebanon (Lubnan ash Sharqi), is almost equal in length and height to the Lebanon Mountains. This fourth geographical region falls swiftly from Mount Hermon to the Hawran Plateau, whence it continues through Jordan south to the Dead Sea. The Barada Gorge divides Anti-Lebanon. In the northern section, few villages are on the western slopes, but in the southern section, featuring Mount Hermon (2860 meters), the western slopes have many villages. Anti-Lebanon is more arid, especially in its northern parts, than Mount Lebanon and is consequently less productive and more thinly populated.

Climate
Lebanon has a Mediterranean climate characterized by a long, hot, and dry summer, and a cool, rainy winter. Fall is a transitional season with a  lowering of temperature and little rain; spring occurs when the winter rains cause the vegetation to revive. Topographical variation creates local modifications of the basic climatic pattern. Along the coast, summers are warm and humid, with little or no rain. Heavy dews form, which are beneficial to agriculture. The daily range of temperature is not wide. A west wind provides relief during the afternoon and evening; at night the wind direction is reversed, blowing from the land out to sea.

Winter is the rainy season, with major precipitation falling after December. Rainfall is generous but is concentrated during only a few days of the rainy season, falling in heavy cloudbursts. The amount of rainfall varies greatly from one year to another. A hot wind blowing from the Egyptian desert called the khamsin (Arabic for "fifty"), may provide a warming trend during the fall but more often occurs during the spring. Bitterly cold winds may come from Southern Europe. Along the coast the proximity to the sea provides a moderating influence on the climate, making the range of temperatures narrower than it is inland, but the temperatures are cooler in the northern parts of the coast where there is also more rain.

In the Lebanon Mountains the gradual increase in altitudes produces extremely cold winters with more precipitation and snow. The summers have a wider daily range of temperatures and less humidity. In the winter, frosts are frequent and snows heavy; in fact, snow covers the highest peaks for much of the year. In the summer, temperatures may rise as high during the daytime as they do along the coast, but they fall far lower at night. Inhabitants of the coastal cities, as well as visitors, seek refuge from the oppressive humidity of the coast by spending much of the summer in the mountains, where numerous summer resorts are located. The influence of the Mediterranean Sea is abated by the altitude and, although the precipitation is even higher than it is along the coast, the range of temperatures is wider and the winters are more severe.

The Biqa Valley and the Anti-Lebanon Mountains are shielded from the influence of the sea by the Lebanon Mountains. The result is considerably less precipitation and humidity and a wider variation in daily and yearly temperatures. The khamsin does not occur in the Biqa Valley, but the north winter wind is so severe that the inhabitants say it can "break nails". Despite the relatively low altitude of the Biqa Valley (the highest point of which, near Baalbek, is only ) more snow falls there than at comparable altitudes west of the Lebanon Mountains.

Because of their altitudes, the Anti-Lebanon Mountains receive more precipitation than the Biqa Valley, despite their remoteness from maritime influences. Much of this precipitation appears as snow, and the peaks of the Anti-Lebanon, like those of the Lebanon Mountains, are snow-covered for much of the year. Temperatures are cooler than in the Biqa Valley.

The Biqa Valley is watered by two rivers that rise in the watershed near Baalbek: the Orontes flowing north (in Arabic it is called Nahr al-Asi, "the Rebel River", because this direction is unusual), and the Litani flowing south into the hill region of the southern Biqa Valley, where it makes an abrupt turn to the west in southern Lebanon and is thereafter called the Al Qasmiyah River. The Orontes continues to flow north into Syria and eventually reaches the Mediterranean in Turkey. Its waters, for much of its course, flow through a channel considerably lower than the surface of the ground. The Nahr Barada, which waters Damascus, has as its source a spring in the Anti-Lebanon Mountains.

Smaller springs and streams serve as tributaries to the principal rivers. Because the rivers and streams have such steep gradients and are so fast moving, they are erosive instead of depository in nature. This process is aided by the soft character of the limestone that composes much of the mountains, the steep slopes of the mountains, and the heavy rainstorms. The only permanent lake is Lake Qaraoun, about ten kilometers east of Jezzine.

Temperatures are rising in Lebanon as a part of global warming. Lebanon is considered to be part of the Fertile Crescent, yet in the meantime with the severe climate changes, it might lose fertility.

Area and boundaries 

AreaTotal: 
Land: 
Water: 

Land boundaries:
Total: 
Border countries:Israel , Syria 

Coastline: 

Maritime claims:
Territorial sea: 
Exclusive Economic Zone: 

Elevation extremes:
Lowest point: Mediterranean Sea  (sea level)
Highest point: Qurnat as Sawda'

Resources and land use
Limestone, iron ore, salt, water-surplus state in a water-deficit region, arable land

Land use:
arable land: 10.72%
permanent crops: 12.06%
other: 77.22% (2011)

Irrigated land:  (2011)

Total renewable water resources:  (2011)

Water in Lebanon

Water is becoming a scarce resource in Lebanon due to climate change, which leads to different rainfall patterns as well as to inefficient methods of distribution within the country. Most of Lebanon's rainfall is in the four months of winter, but over the last 45 years, the Ministry of Environment (Lebanon) estimates that rainfall has decreased overall between 5 and 20 percent. The coastal strip of Lebanon gets approximately 2,000 mm of rain per year, while the Beqaa Valley to the east gets only one-tenth as much. In 2004, only about 21% of households across Lebanon had constant access to water in the summer months, with most of those households concentrated in or near Beirut. It is predicted that in future years, there will be higher temperatures, lower rainfall, and longer droughts, leading to even less access to water. According to the Ministry of Environment, several factors that are putting stress on Lebanon's water resources are unsustainable water management practices, increasing water demand from all sectors, water pollution, and ineffective water governance. Lebanon has struggled with inadequate water and sanitation services for many years. The factors with the greatest effect on quality and quantity of water resources in Lebanon are population growth, urbanization (88% of the population now lives in urban areas), economic growth, and climate change. In recent years, population growth has been increased rapidly with the addition of many Syrian refugees. Some new projects have been proposed to restructure the water sector. Currently, over 48 percent of water supplied by the public system is lost through seepage and wastewater networks are extremely poor, or even non-existent in some areas. One project that is currently being implemented by the Ministry of Environment in collaboration with the United Nations Development Programme (UNDP) focusses on harvesting rainwater from agricultural greenhouse tops in order to increase water harvesting and reduce the pressure on pumping groundwater. This project is expected to increase water availability during the especially critical months of late summer and early autumn when there is less precipitation, which would help to reduce the risk of salinity in both soil and water, and to increase the resilience of crops faced with prolonged drought. There are also proposed projects that suggest the agricultural sector use recycled waste water to allow for more fresh and potable water for consumption. This would be a huge improvement, as solid-wast treatment facilities are in short supply, and over 92 percent of Lebanon's sewage runs untreated directly into water-courses and the sea. If Lebanon does not reform its water sector, it is likely that there will be chronic and critical water shortages by 2020, which would create needs the Ministry of Energy and Water (MEW) would be unable to meet. Water is becoming a scarce resource and if Lebanon instates reformed practices, the progression forward into future water scarcity can be slowed.

Influence of Syrian Refugees on Lebanon's Resources 
As of September 2019, approximately 1.5 million Syrian refugees reside in Lebanon. As the number of Refugees of the Syrian Civil War in Lebanon rises, Lebanon continues to face more major challenges to its food and water security. The refugee situation is placing tremendous pressure on the country's resources. There are serious changes in Lebanon's water availability and agricultural production as a result of climate change and population growth, making it more difficult to fulfill the needs of refugees. More than 40% of farmers in Kfardebian and 81% in the Beqa'a region have reported water shortages being exacerbated by the region's close proximity to Syria and the influx of refugees. Water scarcity affects the quantity and quality of water available to the villages, food security, and land availability for living and for cultivating. The influx of Syrian refugees is not something the Lebanese government could have reasonably prepared for as it happened so rapidly, but international aid has proven to also be inadequate for the scale of the crisis, especially in the Beqa'a and Northern Lebanon region, which borders closely with Syria. Arrivals of refugees to Lebanon grew at an unprecedented pace in 2013 and 2014, with an average of 47,000 refugees being registered by UNHCR per month. Close to 30 percent of the refugee population are left without access to safe drinking water because of the increased water scarcity in the region. One issue with providing adequate care for the refugees is that both Syria and Lebanon have deeply divided populations, meaning that their current priorities are not climate change or population growth as much as they are regime stability and national security. Because of this priority focus away from refugees, Lebanon needs major international assistance to meet immediate humanitarian needs, as well as to strengthen water infrastructure and irrigation throughout the country. By the beginning of 2015, there were an estimated 1.3 million Syrian refugees living in Lebanon, and it is expected that this number will rise to approximately 1.8 million by December 2015.It is estimated to be around 2 million Syrian refugees as of September 2019. "As their displacement extends and their savings deplete, refugees' socio-economic vulnerability increases." Syrian refugees who were born in Lebanon are at an increased risk, as 72 percent of them do not possess official birth certificates. The majority of refugees have settled in the Beqa'a region. Because of the influx, not only has Lebanon suffered on a basis of resources and environmental stress, but Lebanon has also suffered economically through a loss of trade, tourism and investment. According to a World Bank Assessment in October 2013, the economic impact of the Syrian crisis was estimated to cost Lebanon USD 7.5 billion, and the country's GDP has plunged from 10 percent before the crisis to 2 percent currently. Public services and infrastructure as well are under severe strain as a result of the refugee influx. A vulnerability assessment conducted by the UN and partner agencies has shown that upward of 70 percent of refugees cannot meet their minimum daily food requirements. 72 percent of all refugees have been receiving monthly food assistance from WFP (World Food Programme). However, in 2015, WFP lost funding and had to reduce the value of food vouchers by 40 percent. There is a serious strain on resources in Lebanon being exacerbated by an influx of refugees in the country, and Lebanon needs more international aid in order to sustain the population in the long-term.

Environmental concerns
Natural hazards include dust storms.

Current environmental degradation concerns include deforestation, soil erosion, desertification, air pollution in Beirut from vehicular traffic and the burning of industrial wastes, and pollution of coastal waters from raw sewage and oil spills.

Lebanon's rugged terrain historically helped isolate, protect, and develop numerous factional groups based on religion, clan, and ethnicity.

Air quality in Lebanon

As a result of increasingly hot summers and its location within the Mediterranean region, which is often cited for having long episodes of pollution, Lebanon, Beirut in particular, is at high risk for air pollution. Approximately 93 percent of Beirut's population is exposed to high levels of air pollution, which can most often be attributed to vehicle-induced emissions, whether it be long-range travel or short commuting traffic. The cost of air pollution to health may exceed ten million dollars a year. The levels of air pollution in Beirut are increasing annually, and were already above acceptable WHO (World Health Organization) standards by 2011. The most noted pollution in Beirut is particulate matter (street dust), chemicals in the air, and vehicle exhaust. Air pollution is exacerbated by city structure and inadequate urban management as indicated by high buildings on narrow streets, which contain air pollutants. Some recommendations for improvement of air quality include encouragement of carpooling and citywide biking, alternative fuels for vehicles, and a widened public transit sector.

The question of air quality has received considerable attention and funding by Lebanon's foreign partners. Between 2013 and 2017, the Lebanese ministry of environment was granted a donation of over 10 million Euros by Greece and the European Union to establish a national air monitoring network, which included at its peak 25 stations. This network was launched in October 2017 at a major event bringing together 26 different institutions; it was to serve as the cornerstone of Lebanon's National Strategy for Air Quality Management, which was released at the end of the same year. By mid-2019, however, the ministry of environment ceased to maintain and operate this network, involving budgetary restrictions. Stations were subsequently looted, even in central Beirut.

Land pollution in Lebanon

Sukleen, Lebanon's largest waste disposal company has a waste management process that goes through several stages, including clean-up and collection, sorting and composting, and burial. However, many argue that Lebanon needs a much better system for disposal of waste to reduce pollution and environmental degradation. The Litani River is Lebanon's largest river and many farms use the river's water to irrigate land and crops. Because of Lebanon's poor waste management system, a lot of waste and pollution ends up in the Litani and contaminates the crops, in turn endangering the health of consumers and farmers alike, contributing to environmental degradation, as well as hurting the agricultural reputation and economy.

Trash protests of January 2014 
In January 2014, protests in the town of Naameh began to arise, effectively blocking disposal of garbage at the landfill for three days. The protests were instated in response to the continued use of the landfill in Naameh beyond the date it was originally meant to close. The landfill began as a six-year project in 1997, but has remained open for seventeen years as of 2015, and without a sufficient alternative location for garbage disposal, it is likely that it will remain open for the foreseeable future. In 1997, Naameh became the country's primary landfill and was initially supposed to hold two million tons of waste. The landfill currently holds ten million tons of trash, and is still in use. Residents of the area in 2014 did not want to extend the landfill agreement, and staged the protests to prevent future plans.

The company in charge of the majority of the area's collection and cleanup of trash is called Sukleen. It serves 364 towns and municipalities within Beirut and Mount Lebanon. The total waste collected by the company rose from 1,140 tons daily in 1994, to 3,100 tons in 2014. Sukleen is the largest government-contracted private waste management company in Lebanon. In response to the protests, which were asking the government for more efficient waste management systems along with the closure of the landfill in Naameh, Sukleen responded to environmentalists by halting service to Beirut and Mount Lebanon for three days. Because the Naameh landfills were closed and Sukleen was out of service, trash began to pile up in the streets of the city, affecting everyone citywide and drawing attention to the issue of city/region waste-management issues.

References

 

bn:লেবানন#ভূগোল